Runaway Horse is a 2007 German comedy film based on the eponymous novella by Martin Walser.

Cast 
 Ulrich Noethen - Helmut Halm
 Ulrich Tukur - Klaus Buch
 Katja Riemann - Sabine Halm
 Petra Schmidt-Schaller - Helene

References

External links 

2007 comedy films
2007 films
German comedy films
Films based on German novels
2000s German films